The Charioteers were an American gospel and pop vocal group from 1930 to 1957.

History

The Charioteers were put together in 1930 by Professor Howard Daniel at Wilberforce University, in Wilberforce, Ohio. They originally called themselves the Harmony Four. Later they changed the name to the Charioteers, from the song "Swing Low, Sweet Chariot", a favorite in the group's repertoire, which they eventually recorded in 1939. Starting with gospel music, the group expanded its repertoire to include popular songs. Their first break came after they won the Ohio State Quartet contest in 1931; soon after, they were engaged to perform on the Cincinnati radio station WLW. They stayed with the station for over two years, until another radio series brought them to New York City.

They signed their first recording contract, with Decca Records, in 1935. Between 1935 and 1939 they recorded for V-Disc, Vocalion, Brunswick, and Decca without having a hit, yet their popularity grew through radio and live performances. The Charioteers recorded with major singers between 1935 and 1945: Pearl Bailey, on the recordings "Who?" and "Don't Ever Leave Me"  in 1945, and Frank Sinatra, on the recordings "Lily Belle", "Don't Forget Tonight, Tomorrow", "I've Got A Home in That Rock", and "Jesus Is a Rock (In a Weary Land)", also in 1945. In 1938, they signed with Columbia Records, where they would stay for over 10 years.

In 1941 they sang in 1404 performances of the musical revue Hellzapoppin', a Broadway hit. They were the studio chorus on Bing Crosby's radio program, Kraft Music Hall, from 1942 to 1946.

The group's leader, Wilfred "Billy" Williams (1910–1972), a recording member for 14 years, left the Charioteers and formed a new group, the Billy Williams Quartet, in the early 1950s. The rest of the Charioteers also left Columbia in 1950 and drifted through five labels over the next seven years.

The Charioteers released 75 single recordings over 22 years. Their last recording was "The Candles", for MGM Records, in 1957.

Hit recordings

Their solo hits include "So Long" (1940, number 23 pop), "On the Boardwalk in Atlantic City" (1946, number 12 pop), "Open the Door, Richard" (1947, number 6 pop), "What Did He Say?" (1948, number 21 pop), "Ooh! Look-a-There, Ain't She Pretty?" (1948, number 20 pop), and "A Kiss and a Rose" (1949, number 8 R&B, number 19 pop).

Awards

The Charioteers were inducted in the Vocal Group Hall of Fame in 2003.

Discography

Selected albums

Charting singles

References

External links
 The Charioteers info

Wilberforce University
Musical groups established in 1930
Musical groups disestablished in 1957
1930 establishments in Ohio
Columbia Records artists